Thomassin may refer to:

People

Surnames
Claude Thomassin, French bow maker, or Archetier
Florence Thomassin, French actress and sculptor
Laurie Thomassin, French retired breaststroke swimmer
Louis Thomassin, French theologian and Oratorian
Louis Thomassin (archetier), French bow maker, or Archetier
Antoine de Thomassin de Peynier (1731–1809), officer of the French Royal Navy

Places
Thomassin, a neighborhood of Pétion-Ville, Haiti